Gavrilovfjellet is a mountain in Sørkapp Land at Spitsbergen, Svalbard. It has a height of 600 m.a.s.l., and is located between Slaklidalen and Liddalen.

References

Mountains of Spitsbergen